Uttara Guruvayurappan Temple is a Hindu Temple located at Mayur Vihar-I in Delhi. The temple is dedicated to Shri Krishna, who is worshiped as Guruvayurappan, the deity of the famous Sri Krishna Temple in Guruvayur town in the state of Kerala. The Temple was founded on 17 May 1983. This temple is most revered by the Malayali and Tamil communities in Delhi.

Architecture 
The temple complex was built on Kerala style of Architecture with two main gopurams at eastern and western sides. The sanctum sanctorum is separated into two chambers and houses the idols of Krishna and Bhagavati. Besides the main Krishna Temple, the complex contains small temples dedicated to Ganapati, Shiva and Ayyappa and a replica of Sarpa Kavu dedicated to Naga Devatas (snake deities).

See also
 Guruvayur Temple

References

Hindu temples in Delhi
Krishna temples
Religious buildings and structures completed in 1983
20th-century architecture in India